Drums of the Desert may refer to:

 Drums of the Desert (1927 film)
 Drums of the Desert (1940 film)